Saverton School, also known as Saverton Community Center , is a historic school building located at Saverton, Ralls County, Missouri.  It was built in 1934, and is a one-story hipped roof, frame building with two school rooms.  It measures 52 feet by 24 feet, with a 52 feet by 13 feet addition constructed in 1960.  The building has housed a community centre since 1959.

It was listed on the National Register of Historic Places in 1998.

References

Schools in Ralls County, Missouri
School buildings completed in 1934
Buildings and structures in Ralls County, Missouri
National Register of Historic Places in Ralls County, Missouri
1934 establishments in Missouri